The Landwind Xiaoyao (逍遙) is a compact CUV produced by Chinese car manufacturer Landwind.

Overview

The Landwind Xiaoyao was previewed by the Landwind Xiaoyao concept during the  2016 Guangzhou Auto Show, and the production version debuted on the 2017 Chengdu Auto Show and was launched on the Chinese car market in Q2 2017. The Landwind Xiaoyao compact CUV was positioned right between the Landwind X2 subcompact CUV and the Landwind X7 compact CUV with prices of the Xiaoyao ranging from 76,900 yuan and ends at 121,700 yuan.

References

External links
Official website 

Landwind vehicles
Crossover sport utility vehicles
Cars of China
Cars introduced in 2017
Compact cars